HMS Tigre may refer to:

 , a 74-gun ship of the line of the Spanish Navy, launched in 1747. She was captured by the Royal Navy on 13 August 1762, and commissioned as the third-rate HMS Tigre.
 , a 74-gun ship of the line of the French Navy. She took part in the Battle of Groix where she was captured by the British, and recommissioned in the Royal Navy as HMS Tigre.

See also
 
 Tigre (disambiguation)

Royal Navy ship names